Dhevvadhoo or Devvadū (Div: ދެއްވަދޫ) is one of the inhabited islands of the administrative division known as Northern Huvadhu Atoll (code letter: Gaafu Alifu).

History
Some of the ancient kings of Maldives traced their ancestry to certain families of this island.
Dhevvadhoo Rasgefaanu, Al-Sultan Mohamed Ibn Haji Ali Thukkalaa (1692-1701), is one of the Kind in the Maldives.

Archaeology
There are many Buddhist archaeological remains in Devvadū. It is likely that it was an important island in that period of Maldivian History.

None of these ancient remains have been properly investigated yet.

Geography
It is a sizeable round island located almost in the centre of Huvadhu Atoll.

Demography

References

HCP Bell, The Maldive Islands; Monograph on the History, Archaeology and Epigraphy. Reprint Colombo 1940. Council for Linguistic and Historical Research. Male’ 1989 
H.C.P. Bell, Excerpta Maldiviana. Reprint Colombo 1922/35 edn. Asian Educational Services. New Delhi 1999 
Xavier Romero-Frias, The Maldive Islanders, A Study of the Popular Culture of an Ancient Ocean Kingdom. Barcelona 1999,  
Hasan A. Maniku. The Islands of Maldives. Novelty. Male 1983.
Ishag Jameel | Dhevvadhoo "The Island Of Maldives''

Islands of the Maldives